The Exu Formation is an Albian geologic formation in Brazil. Pterosaur fossils of Lophocratia indet. have been recovered from the formation.

See also 
 List of pterosaur-bearing stratigraphic units
 Basin history of the Araripe Basin

References

Further reading 
 
 

Geologic formations of Brazil
Lower Cretaceous Series of South America
Cretaceous Brazil
Albian Stage
Sandstone formations
Fluvial deposits
Formations